Christopher Earle is a Canadian actor, playwright and theatre director.

Career 
Earle is best known for his 1999 play Radio :30, which won the Floyd S. Chalmers Canadian Play Award in 2001. His other plays have included Russell Hill, Runnymede, The Proceedings, Democrats Abroad and Big Head Goes to Bed.

Personal life 
He is married to actress and theatre director Shari Hollett. The two first met as members of The Second City's Toronto stage company, for which Earle has also directed. Their son, Sam Earle, is also an actor, who appeared on Degrassi: The Next Generation.

Filmography

Film

Television

References

External links

20th-century Canadian dramatists and playwrights
21st-century Canadian dramatists and playwrights
20th-century Canadian male actors
21st-century Canadian male actors
Canadian male dramatists and playwrights
Canadian male film actors
Canadian male television actors
Canadian male voice actors
Canadian male stage actors
Canadian theatre directors
Living people
20th-century Canadian male writers
21st-century Canadian male writers